Fernando Salas may refer to:

 Fernando Salas (baseball) (born 1985), Mexican professional baseball pitcher
 Fernando Salas (weightlifter) (born 1988), Ecuadorian male weightlifter